DaLeaka Menin (born 16 June 1995) is a Canadian rugby union player. She plays at Prop for Canada internationally and for Exeter Chiefs Women in the Premier 15s. Menin played for the University of Calgary DinosCalgary Dinos across five years, scoring 23 tries on the team. Menin's received numerous merits including the U-Sports Rookie of the Year award in the 2013-2014 season and the U-Sports players of the year award in 2016-2017.

She competed for Canada at the 2017 Women's Rugby World Cup in Ireland. Menin made her debut against the New Zealand Black Ferns side in 2015 where the Canadian side lost 40-22. Menin is primarily known for playing tighthead prop but can also play loosehead prop.

Menin was selected in Canada's squad for the 2021 Rugby World Cup in New Zealand. Menin started every game at the 2022 Rugby World Cup at tighthead prop.

References

Living people
1995 births
Female rugby union players
Canada women's international rugby union players